Sir George Francis Hill, KCB, FBA (22 December 1867 – 18 October 1948) was the director and principal librarian of the British Museum (1931–1936). He was a specialist in Renaissance  medals.

Early years 
George Hill was born in Berhampur, India. His grandfather, Micaiah Hill, founded the London Missionary Society's outpost there and his father, Samuel John Hill, was stationed where George was born.  He attended Blackheath College (later known as  Eltham College) followed by University College, London, and finally Merton College, Oxford. He studied under Percy Gardner at Merton, taking a first class degree in classics. There he also gained an interest in numismatics. He was awarded the medal of the Royal Numismatic Society in 1915.

Career 
In 1893, Hill joined the British Museum in the Coins and Medals Department.  At that time, the department was the centre of study of Greek coins. Hill continued the work of Barclay Head and Reginald Poole; in 1897 was published the first volume of a catalogue of Greek coins. Hill subsequently produced catalogues of many of the British Museum's collections in his area. In 1912, he became keeper of the department. In 1931, he was appointed Director and Principal Librarian of the British Museum. Whilst director, he purchased the Codex Sinaiticus from the Soviet Union and, with the Victoria and Albert Museum, the George Eumorfopoulos oriental antiquities collection.

Hill was editor of the Journal of Hellenic Studies from 1898 to 1912. He was knighted in 1933.

Personal life 
In 1897, he married Mary Paul, whose parents lived in Rome, Italy.
He retired in 1936 and died in London in 1948.

Bibliography 
 Hill, George Francis, Historical Greek Coins, London : Archibald Constable and Co., 1906.
 Ward, John, Greek Coins and their Parent Cities, London : John Murray, 1902. (accompanied by a catalogue of the author’s collection by Sir George Francis Hill)
 
 Hill, George Francis, The Development of Arabic Numerals in Europe, Oxford, 1915.
Hill, Francis, A History of Cyprus in 4 volumes, Cambridge, 1940–1952.
 Vol. 1, To the Conquest by Richard Lion Heart, 1940. 2010 pbk reprint 
 Vol. 2, The Frankish Period, 1192–1432, 1940. 2010 pbk reprint 
 Vol. 3, The Frankish Period, 1432–1571, 1948.  2010 pbk reprint 
 Vol. 4, (edited by Harry Luke) The Ottoman Province, the British Colony, 1571–1948, 1952; 2010 pbk reprint

References

External links

 
 
 Books by George Francis Hill
 Digital Library Numis (DLN) Online numismatic books and articles

1867 births
1948 deaths
People from West Bengal
Alumni of University College London
Alumni of Merton College, Oxford
English curators
English numismatists
English non-fiction writers
Academic journal editors
Directors of the British Museum
Knights Commander of the Order of the Bath
English male non-fiction writers
Scholars of ancient Greek history